Storm Over Lisbon is a 1944 American thriller film produced and directed by George Sherman and starring Vera Ralston. The screenplay concerns a nightclub owner who attempts to gain secret information.

The film's sets were designed by the art director Gano Chittenden.

Plot
During World War II, the owner of a Lisbon nightclub attempts to gain secret information to sell to the Japanese.

Cast
 Vera Hruba Ralston as Maria Mazarek
 Richard Arlen as John Craig
 Erich von Stroheim as Deresco
 Otto Kruger as Alexis Vanderlyn
 Eduardo Ciannelli as Blanco
 Robert Livingston as Bill Flanagan
 Mona Barrie as Evelyn
 Frank Orth as Mutgatroyd
 Sarah Edwards as Maude Perry-Tonides
 Alice Fleming as Agatha Sanford-Richards
 Kenne Duncan as Paul
 Leon Belasco as Fabo Singer
 The Aida Broadbent Girls as Dancers

Restoration
A new restoration of Storm Over Lisbon by Paramount Pictures, The Film Foundation, and Martin Scorsese was screened at the Museum of Modern Art on February 9, 2018, as part of the museum's program of showcasing 30 restored films from the library of Republic Pictures curated by Scorsese.

References

Bibliography
Lennig, Arthur. Stroheim. University Press of Kentucky, 2000.

External links

1944 films
1940s thriller films
American black-and-white films
American thriller films
1940s English-language films
Films directed by George Sherman
Films set in Lisbon
Republic Pictures films
World War II films made in wartime
World War II spy films
Films set in nightclubs